Baqên Township (Tibetan: སྦྲ་ཆེན་, Wylie Sbra Chen; Chinese: 巴青乡; Pinyin: Bāqīng Xiang) is a small township in Baqên County within Nagqu Prefecture in the north of the Tibet Autonomous Region of China.

See also
List of towns and villages in Tibet Autonomous Region

References

Populated places in Nagqu